The 1956 Tonbridge by-election was held on 7 June 1956 due to the resignation of the Conservative Member of Parliament, Gerald Williams.  It was retained by the Conservative candidate Richard Hornby.  Although Tonbridge was usually a safe Conservative seat, this election was fought with a local Labour politician and against the backdrop of Anthony Eden's unpopular government, so the Conservative majority was cut to barely 1,600 votes.

References

Tonbridge by-election
Tonbridge, 1956
Tonbridge by-election
Tonbridge by-election
Tonbridge and Malling
Tonbridge by-election, 1956